Massy-Verrières is a station of the Île-de-France RER, in Massy, at the junction of RER B (B4 section) and RER C (C2 section). Its station is at nearby Verrières-le-Buisson.

External links

 

Railway stations in France opened in 1854
Réseau Express Régional stations
Railway stations in Essonne